Colin John Ford  (born 1934) is a British photographic curator, historian of photography, and former museum director. He has written a number of books on the history of photography.

Life
Ford was educated at University College, Oxford University. He began his career in the theatre. He has been a director and broadcaster. Between 1972 and 1982 he was Keeper of Film and Photography at the National Portrait Gallery, London. He then became the first director of the UK National Museum of Photography, Film and Television in Bradford (later to become the National Media Museum). From 1992 he was Director of the National Museums and Galleries of Wales.

Ford has interviewed contemporary photographers such as Don McCullin. He also gives lectures on the history of photography.

Until 2010, he was Chairman of the Kraszna-Krausz Foundation. He is Vice-President of the Julia Margaret Cameron Trust and Chairman of the Peel Entertainment Group.

Books

 An Early Victorian Album: The Photographic Masterpieces of David Octavius Hill and Robert Adamson (1974).
 The Cameron Collection: An Album of Photographs by Julia Margaret Cameron (1975).
 Portraits (1982).
 Eyewitness: Hungarian Photography in the 20th Century: Brassaï, Capa, Kertész, Moholy-Nagy, Munkásci, Royal Academy of Arts (2011), with Péter Baki. .

Awards and legacy
Ford is a Commander of the Order of the British Empire (CBE).

The Royal Photographic Society established the annual Colin Ford Award in 2003 for contributions to curatorship, named after Colin Ford as the first director of the National Museum of Photography, Film and Television.

There are several photographs of Ford in the National Portrait Gallery (London) collection, including works by Arnold Newman, Norman Parkinson, and Cheryl Twomey.

References

External links
 Eyewitness With Curator Colin Ford on YouTube

1934 births
Living people
Alumni of University College, Oxford
British broadcasters
British theatre directors
British curators
British historians
Photography curators
Historians of photography
People associated with the National Portrait Gallery
Directors of museums in the United Kingdom
Commanders of the Order of the British Empire
Place of birth missing (living people)
People associated with Amgueddfa Cymru – Museum Wales